Johnny Savas Joannou (April 22, 1940 – May 6, 2016) was an American politician of the Democratic Party. He was a member of the Virginia House of Delegates 1976–1983, the Senate of Virginia 1984–1991, and the House again from 1998 to 2016. He last represented the 79th district, made up of parts of the cities of Chesapeake, Norfolk, Portsmouth, and Suffolk. Joannou died of lung cancer, on May 6, 2016, in Portsmouth, Virginia.

Notes

References

External links
 Richmond Sunlight; Delegate Johnny Joannou
 Virginia Public Access Project; Johnny S Joannou

1940 births
2016 deaths
Democratic Party Virginia state senators
Democratic Party members of the Virginia House of Delegates
Virginia Tech alumni
University of Richmond School of Law alumni
Virginia lawyers
People from Brooklyn
Politicians from Portsmouth, Virginia
Deaths from cancer in Virginia
20th-century American lawyers
21st-century American lawyers
Deaths from lung cancer
21st-century American politicians